Mykola Prysyazhnyuk ( (born 3 January 1960 in Ksaveriv (Zhytomyr Oblast), in the Ukrainian SSR of the Soviet Union) is the former Minister of Agrarian Policy and Food of Ukraine.

Biography 

Prysyazhnyuk graduated from Voronezh University and the Donbas Mining-Metallurgical Institute. He has worked as a diamond cutter before becoming a chief process engineer at Ordzhonikidzevugillya coal mine. In the years 2002-2005 he was the first deputy chairman of Zhytomyr Regional State Administration and in the years 2005-2007 head of the National Association of Meat and Meat Products Producers before becoming a member of the Verkhovna Rada (Ukraine's parliament) for the Party of Regions in the 2006 Ukrainian parliamentary elections, keeping his seat in the 2007 elections. He did not participate in the 2012 Ukrainian parliamentary election and 2014 Ukrainian parliamentary election.

References

External links
Personal website 

Living people
1960 births
Agriculture ministers of Ukraine
Agriculture and food provision ministers of Ukraine
Fifth convocation members of the Verkhovna Rada
Sixth convocation members of the Verkhovna Rada
21st-century Ukrainian engineers
21st-century Ukrainian businesspeople
Ukrainian billionaires
Party of Regions politicians
People from Zhytomyr Oblast
Voronezh State University alumni